Socio-economic mobility in Canada refers to the movement of Canadians from one social class or economic level to another, The data shows an increase in intergenerational social mobility, however it is argued that such trends have remained stable since the 1990s.

Background
Data for mobility analyses are drawn primarily from the Canadian Mobility Survey and Statistics Canada

Trends

See also

 Socio-economic mobility in the United States

References

 
Economy of Canada
Canada